Galsworthy is a surname. People with the surname include:

 Arthur Galsworthy (1916–1986), British soldier and diplomat
 Anthony Galsworthy (born 1944), British diplomat
 John Galsworthy (1867–1933), English novelist and playwright
 John Galsworthy (diplomat) (1919–1992), British diplomat
 Marilyn Galsworthy (born 1954), British actress
 Mike Galsworthy (fl. 2003–2019), British media commentator
 Robert Galsworthy (born 1989), Australian weightlifter